Nathan Webb may refer to:
 Nathan Webb (minister) (1705–1772), American Congregational Church minister
 Nathan Webb (Massachusetts legislator) (1767–1853), Boston Selectman; member of Massachusetts House of Representatives
 Nathan Webb (judge) (1825–1902), United States federal judge
 Nathan Webb (footballer) (born 1998), English footballer